In the music industry, a pre-release cover version is a type of cover version that arises when a cover artist releases a version of a song before the original artist does. This practise takes advantage of a 'release window'; it occurs when an upcoming song receives much airplay despite not yet having been released. Pre-release cover versions are common in the UK because of the unique situation there in that songs by big acts get weeks of airplay before being released, giving cover artists enough time for session musicians and computer experts to record a near-exact cover version of the song. For example, UK number one "Talk Dirty" by Jason Derulo featuring 2 Chainz, made No. 71 the week before it made No. 1 in the form of a pre-release cover version by Select Hits. Usually the original artist's record label will notice the cover version and release the original early; one example is when Can You Blow My covered Flo Rida's "Whistle" and making the top 40 at No. 38, causing Rida's record label to rush-release the song mid-week. Avicii's "Wake Me Up!" was intended to be released on 8 September 2013 however on 15 July 2013 the Official Charts Company announced that it would be released that week after a group called Spark Productions recorded a pre-release cover version and made No. 26 on the UK Singles Chart with it.

A successful pre-release cover version is Precision Tunes' version of Maroon 5's "Payphone", which sold 34,492 copies and charted in the top ten on three charts. After The Sunday Telegraph tracked him down, he said that "We have currently restructured [PT Records] and its employees, [and] are in the process of issuing takedowns [of our previously released covers] and researching accounting for those releases and plan to relinquish any monies made on the nine releases".

Legal status
While the practice is legal, the area of licensing they are operating in has been described by PRS for Music as "tricky". Barney Hooper from PRS for Music said that along with record labels and publishers the trend was something they were "investigating" and "thinking about a bit more". 

In the United States, a songwriter has the preemptive right to determine who will record the first version of a song, making pre-release covers less common there.

References

Cover versions
Song forms
Music production